Louis Peglion (8 March 1906 in Marseille – 15 August 1986) was a French professional road bicycle racer, who won one stage in the 1930 Tour de France. He was a touriste-routier in that Tour, which meant that he was not a member of a national team.

Major results

1930
Tour de France:
Winner stage 14
Critèrium de Var
1931
Tour de France:
7th place overall classification

External links 

Official Tour de France results for Louis Peglion

French male cyclists
1906 births
1986 deaths
French Tour de France stage winners
Cyclists from Marseille